Wilfred Owen: A Remembrance Tale was a 1-hour 2007 BBC documentary on the life of the First World War poet Wilfred Owen.  It was presented by Jeremy Paxman and starred Samuel Barnett as Owen and Deborah Findlay as his mother Susan. It premiered on BBC One on Remembrance Sunday 2007.

External links

BBC television documentaries
2007 television films
2007 films
World War I
Documentary films about poets
2000s British films